Andreas Petroulakis (born 12 May 1958) is a prominent Greek political cartoonist. He started his career in the morning Athens newspaper To Vima in March 1985, and shortly afterwards moved on to I Avgi, the official newspaper of the leftist revisionist party Synaspismos, where he stayed until 2000. Since then, he has been working for daily broadsheet Kathimerini. Petroulakis is characterised by his subtle humor and unyielding criticism of current events and public figures.

References

Greek cartoonists
Greek caricaturists
1958 births
Living people